Asteropeia matrambody is a species of plant in the Asteropeiaceae family. It is endemic to Madagascar.  Its natural habitat is moist lowland forest. It is threatened by habitat loss.

References

Endemic flora of Madagascar
Flora of the Madagascar lowland forests
matrambody
Endangered plants
Taxonomy articles created by Polbot
Taxa named by René Paul Raymond Capuron